Rittenhouse Army Heliport  formally Williams Field Auxiliary No. 2 is an Arizona Army National Guard training airstrip  east of the central business district of Queen Creek, a city in Pinal County, Arizona, United States and  southeast of Phoenix Sky Harbor International Airport.

Although most U.S. airports use the same three-letter location identifier for the FAA, IATA, and ICAO, this airport is only assigned AZ38 by the FAA.

Williams Field Auxiliary No. 2 was one of many auxiliary fields that served Williams Field (now Phoenix-Mesa Gateway Airport) and is one of many Arizona World War II Army Airfields.

Facilities and aircraft 

It has one asphalt runway:
 12/30 measuring 

No aircraft are based at this airfield.

References

External links 

Airports in Pinal County, Arizona